The 3rd Arkansas Consolidated Infantry (1864–1865) was a Confederate Army infantry regiment during the American Civil War. The regiment is separate from and has no connection with the 3rd Arkansas Infantry Regiment which served in the Confederate Army of Northern Virginia and is also separate from the 3rd Regiment, Arkansas State Troops, which participated in the Battle of Wilson's Creek.

Organization
In September 1864, the remnants of several Arkansas Regiments captured at the Siege of Vicksburg or Port Hudson and later exchanged were consolidated in the Trans-Mississippi Department. There is some evidence that this consolidation may have occurred as a field consolidation as early as May 1864.  The 3rd Arkansas Consolidated Infantry was created by combining the following depleted regiments:

 15th (Gee/Johnson) Arkansas Infantry Regiment.
 19th Arkansas Infantry Regiment, (Dockery's)
 20th Arkansas Infantry Regiment.

Col. H.G.P. Williams was selected to command the new consolidated regiment. On  September 30, 1864 the 3rd Arkansas Consolidated Infantry was assigned to Brigadier General Evander McNair's 2nd (Arkansas) Brigade, Acting Major General Thomas J. Churchill’s 1st (Arkansas) Division, Major General John B. Magruder’s Second Army Corps, Army of the Trans-Mississippi and remained in that assignment through December 31, 1864.  In mid October, 1864, Brigadier General McNair was the Acting Division Commander, with Division headquarters at Camden, Arkansas, and Colonel Williams was appointed as the Division Inspector of Field Works. On 17 November 1864, a union spy reported that the McNair's Brigade and Churhill's Division was in the vicinity of Camden, in Ouachita County, Arkansas. On 31 December 1864, General Kirby Smith's report on the organization of his forces lists the regiment, under the command of Colonel H.G.P. Williams as still belonging to Brigadier General Evander McNair's, 2nd Brigade of Acting Major General Thomas J. Churchill's 1st Arkansas Infantry Division of Major General John B. Magruder's 2nd Army Corps, Confederate Army of the Trans-Mississippi.

On 22 January 1865, Major General Churchill was ordered to move his division to Minden, Louisiana, and occupy winter quarters. On 23 January 1865, Major General Churchill sent a dispatch to Colonel Hawthorn at Dooley's Ferry and directed his movement to Minden, Louisiana.

Union commanders in the Department of the Gulf reported on March 20, 1865 that General McNair's brigade was composed of the 1st, 2nd and 3rd Consolidated Regiments, Commanded by Colonels Cravens, Ried, and Williams respectively and that the regiments were made up of paroled prisoners from Vicksburg and Port Hudson. The report provided their location as Minden, Louisiana, with the rest of Churchill's Division. In early April 1865, the division concentrated near Shreaveport Louisiana, and then moved to Marshall, Texas by mid April 1865.

Surrender
This regiment was surrendered with the Department of the Trans-Mississippi, General Kirby Smith commanding, May 26, 1865.  When the Trans-Mississippi Department surrendered, all of the Arkansas infantry regiments were encamped in and around Marshall, Texas (war-ravaged Arkansas no longer able to subsist the army). The regiments were ordered to report to Shreveport, Louisiana, to be paroled. None of them did so. Some soldiers went to Shreveport on their own to be paroled, but the regiments simply disbanded without formally surrendering. A company or two managed to keep together until they got home. For example, Company G, 35th Arkansas Infantry Regiment, traveled back to Van Buren, Arkansas where they surrendered to the U.S. post commander in a formal ceremony, drawn up in front of the court-house, laying down their weapons, etc. But for the most part, the men simply went home. Many of the Arkansas Cavalry  units, which had largely been furloughed for the winter of 1864-1865 following Price's disastrous Missouri Expedition did formally surrender at Jacksonport, Wittsburg, and a few other locations.

See also

 List of Arkansas Civil War Confederate units
 Lists of American Civil War Regiments by State
 Confederate Units by State
 Arkansas in the American Civil War
 Arkansas Militia in the Civil War

References

External links
 Edward G. Gerdes Civil War Home Page
 The Encyclopedia of Arkansas History and Culture
 The War of the Rebellion: a Compilation of the Official Records of the Union and Confederate Armies
 The Arkansas History Commission, State Archives, Civil War in Arkansas
 

Units and formations of the Confederate States Army from Arkansas
1865 disestablishments in Arkansas
Military units and formations disestablished in 1865
Military units and formations in Arkansas
Military in Arkansas
1861 establishments in Arkansas
Military units and formations established in 1861